A Man's Neck (French: La tête d'un homme) is a 1933 French crime film directed by Julien Duvivier and starring Harry Baur, Valéry Inkijinoff, Gaston Jacquet and Gina Manès.It is an adaptation of the 1931 novel A Battle of Nerves by Georges Simenon, featuring the fictional detective Jules Maigret. It was the third film in cinema history to feature the Maigret character. It was remade in 1950 as The Man on the Eiffel Tower.

The film's sets were designed by the art director Georges Wakhévitch.

The French title translates literally as "A Man's Head," rather than "A Man's Neck," the American-release title.  In both cases, the title alludes to execution by the guillotine, which was last used in 1977 in France for criminals convicted of capital crimes.

Plot 
In a Montparnasse cafe, Willy Ferrièrre (Gaston Jacquet), a gambler living beyond his means, suggests out loud that he would pay 10,000 francs for someone to kill his wealthy aunt so he can claim his inheritance.  An unseen person slips him a note taking up his offer.  Later, at night, a low-life criminal, Joseph Heurtin (Alexandre Rignault), enters the aunt's house, tracking footprints in the dark and following a map to the aunt's bedroom, where he expects to find a cache of money.  Stumbling in the dark, he comes on the woman's dead body and with bloody hands leaves his fingerprints all over.  A shadowy figure emerges (later revealed to be Radek (Vàlery Inkijinof), a Czech emigré) who assures Heurtin that he will clean up the prints and tells him to hide out.  After Heurtin leaves, Radek walks out of the house and locks the door without cleaning up the crime scene.

The murder case is assigned to Inspector Maigret (Harry Baur), whose men follow the clues left to discover Heurtin's identity and track him to his parents' house in Versailles, where he has been hiding.  Under arrest, Heurtin protests his innocence and tells Maigret about the other man in the aunt's house.  The magistrate assigned to the case doesn't believe Heurtin's story and is ready to prosecute him, but Maigret allows the man to escape and has him followed by his men.  Heurtin unknowingly leads Maigret back to the cafe where Radek, who is now blackmailing Ferrièrre, draws his attention.  Suspecting that a third person is involved in the murder, Maigret has several encounters with Radek, who all but confesses to the "perfect crime," but Heurtin is able to escape from police surveillance.

Though officially removed from the case for letting Heurtin escape, Maigret suspects that Radek will lead him to the person who first hired the murderer.  Returning again to the cafe, Maigret sits and drinks with Ferrièrre and his mistress Edna (Gina Manès).  While there, Radek, who is dying of tuberculosis, confronts Willy and Edna and takes her to his apartment, while Ferrièrre does nothing.  At his apartment, Radek confesses his passion for Edna, his loneliness as he is dying, and his hatred of higher-class pretenders like Ferrièrre.  While Edna struggles with Radek, Maigret and his men approach the apartment, but Radek is set on by Heurtin.  In the ensuing fight, Radek shoots one of Maigret's men, but he and Heurtin are both killed.  Maigret leaves the building with Ferrièrre under arrest.

Cast 
 Harry Baur as Commissaire Jules Maigret
 Valéry Inkijinoff as Radek 
 Alexandre Rignault as Joseph Heurtin
 Gaston Jacquet as Willy Ferrière
 Louis Gauthier as Le juge
 Henri Échourin as Inspecteur Ménard
 Marcel Bourdel as Inspecteur Janvier
 Frédéric Munié as L'avocat
 Armand Numès as Le directeur de la police
 Charles Camus as L'hôtelier
 René Alexandre as Le chauffeur
 Gina Manès as Edna Reichberg
 Missia as La chanteuse des rues
 Oléo as La femme de chambre
 Line Noro as La fille
 Damia as La femme lasse
 Jérôme Goulven as Un témoin 
 Jane Pierson as La cuisinière
 René Stern as Le gérard de l'Éden

References

Bibliography

External links 
 
La Tete d'un Homme at Turner Classic Movies

1933 films
French crime films
1933 crime films
1930s French-language films
Films directed by Julien Duvivier
Pathé films
Maigret films
French black-and-white films
1930s police procedural films
1930s French films